The Central District of Jowayin County is a district (bakhsh) in Jowayin County, Razavi Khorasan Province, Iran. At the 2006 census, its population was 34,489, in 9,001 families.  The District has one city: Neqab.  The District has two rural districts (dehestan): Pirakuh Rural District and Bala Jowayin Rural District.

References 

Districts of Razavi Khorasan Province
Joveyn County